Chic Lady is a jazz album recorded by Toshiko Akiyoshi in 1991 and released on the Nippon Crown record label.

Track listing
"My Elegy" (Akiyoshi) – 6:15
"Travelin'" (Lewis) – 4:09
"Sophisticated Lady" (Ellington) – 6:01
"Chic Lady" (Akiyoshi) – 7:30
"Don't be Afraid, The Clown's Afraid Too" (Mingus) – 5:18
"Lady Liberty" (Akiyoshi) – 4:16
"Blue Bossa" (Dorham) – 5:01
"No Due Blues" (Tabackin) – 5:04

Personnel
Toshiko Akiyoshi – piano
Lewis Nash – drums
Peter Washington – bass
John Eckert – trumpet, flugelhorn
Scott Robinson – alto saxophone, baritone saxophone
Walt Weiskopf – tenor saxophone (Tracks 2, 3, 6, 8)
Matt Finders – trombone, bass trombone, tuba (Tracks 1, 4, 5, 7)

References / External Links
Nippon Crown CRCJ-91004 
jazzdisco.org

Toshiko Akiyoshi albums
1991 albums